Cristóvão Artur Chume is a Mozambican military general who has been the Minister of National Defense since his appointment in November 2021. He had previously served as the Commander of the Army Branch of the Mozambique Defence Armed Forces from March to November 2021.

Background
Chume served as the National Director of Defense Policy from 2011 to 2019. During the clashes between RENAMO and the Defense and Security Forces between 2013 and 2014, Chume was one of the main faces representing the Ministry of Defense.

In 2019, he was appointed head of the Marechal Samora Machel Military Academy in Nampula. On 12 March 2021, Chume was appointed as the Commander of the Army Branch of the Mozambique Defence Armed Forces (MDAF) by president Filipe Nyusi  after changes in the structure of the Defense Armed Forces promoted by the Mozambican Head of State. Major-General Francisco Zacarias Mataruca was appointed to replace him as chief of the Military Academy.

On 11 November 2021, Nyusi dismissed Chume as Commander of the Army Branch and appointed him as  Minister of National Defense, replacing Jaime Neto, who was sacked by Nyusi a day earlier.

References

Living people
Year of birth missing (living people)
Place of birth missing (living people)
FRELIMO politicians
Defence ministers of Mozambique
Mozambican military personnel